Rishith Reddy (born 29 November 2003) is an Indian cricketer. He made his T20 debut on 22 October 2022, for Hyderabad against Manipur in the 2022–23 Syed Mushtaq Ali Trophy. He made his List A debut on 13 November 2022, for Hyderabad against Tripura in the 2022–23 Vijay Hazare Trophy.

In December 2021, he made debut for the India U-19 and took five-wicket haul in the same match. He was also named in the India's squad as stand-by player for the 2022 Under-19 Cricket World Cup.

References

External links
 

2003 births
Living people
Indian cricketers
Hyderabad cricketers
Place of birth missing (living people)